Lapara phaeobrachycerous, the Gulf pine sphinx, is a moth of the family Sphingidae. It is known from pine forests in the US states of Mississippi and eastern Louisiana.

The wingspan is 64–78 mm. The upperside of the forewing is charcoal gray to brownish gray with white scales and one or two black dashes. The upperside of the hindwing is uniform charcoal gray to brownish gray.

There are five generations per year with adults on wing from April to October in Louisiana.

The larvae probably feed on Pinus species, such as Pinus palustris and Pinus taeda.

References

Sphingini
Moths described in 1994